Take Back Plenty (1990), is a novel by British writer Colin Greenland, which won both major British science fiction awards, the 1990 British SF Association award and the 1991 Arthur C. Clarke Award, as well as being a nominee for the 1992 Philip K. Dick Award for the best original paperback published that year in the United States.

The Plenty series starts with Take Back Plenty and continues with Seasons of Plenty (1995), the collection The Plenty Principle (1997), containing a prequel to the series "In the Garden: The Secret Origin of the Zodiac Twins". and Mother of Plenty (1998)

Plot
While it is a time of festivity on Mars, freighter captain Tabitha Jute isn't interested in the celebration. She is trying to elude planetary law enforcement agencies, almost bankrupt  and about to lose her sole asset  and her best friend, her starship "Alice Liddell". Unexpectedly, millionaire entertainer and entrepreneur Marco Metz arrives at her hideout and  promises renumeration if she takes him to the distant giant spaceship Plenty, as well as his band. However, Metz is not what he seems. He is actually the estranged father of two of the other band members, who appear to be in an incestuous relationship and has also engaged Jute under false pretenses, intending to steal the Frasque, an alien artefact. En route, they become entangled with the Capellans, an advanced alien species who have confined humanity to the solar system and prohibited interstellar travel .

Reception
Both Michael Moorcock and Brian Aldiss praised the novel. Moorcock stated that the novel was "intelligent, literate space opera" in the tradition of The Stars My Destination, The Paradox Men by Charles L. Harness and Nova.

References

Sources
 Clute, John and Peter Nicholls. The Encyclopedia of Science Fiction. New York: St. Martin's Griffin 1993 (2nd edition 1995). .

External links
 

1990 British novels
British science fiction novels
1990 science fiction novels
Sequel novels